John Frederick Heil III (born 1968) is an American lawyer from Oklahoma who is the Chief United States district judge of the United States District Court for the Northern District of Oklahoma. In addition to his appointment to the Northern District, he is also a judge in the United States District Court for the Western District of Oklahoma and United States District Court for the Eastern District of Oklahoma.

Education 

Heil earned his Bachelor of Science from Oklahoma State University and his Juris Doctor, with honors, from the University of Tulsa College of Law, where he served as an Editor for the Tulsa Law Journal.

Career 

Before joining Hall Estill, Heil served the State of Oklahoma as Assistant District Attorney in the Tulsa County District Attorney’s Office. From 2000 to 2020, he was a shareholder and director at Hall, Estill, Hardwick, Gable, Golden & Nelson in Tulsa, Oklahoma, where his practice focused on complex commercial litigation.

Federal judicial service 

On November 6, 2019, President Donald Trump announced his intent to nominate Heil to serve as a United States district judge for the United States District Court for the Northern District of Oklahoma, United States District Court for the Western District of Oklahoma and United States District Court for the Eastern District of Oklahoma. On December 2, 2019, his nomination was sent to the Senate. President Trump nominated Heil to the seat vacated by Judge James H. Payne, who assumed senior status on August 1, 2017. On January 3, 2020, his nomination was returned to the President under Rule XXXI, Paragraph 6 of the United States Senate. On January 6, 2020, his renomination was sent to the Senate. A hearing on his nomination before the Senate Judiciary Committee was held on January 8, 2020. On March 12, 2020, his nomination was reported out of committee by a 16–5 vote. On May 20, 2020, the Senate invoked cloture on his nomination by a 76–16 vote. Later that same day, his nomination was confirmed by a 75–17 vote. He received his judicial commission on May 27, 2020. He has served as the Chief Judge of the Northern District of Oklahoma since 2021.

References

External links 
 

|-

1968 births
Living people
20th-century American lawyers
21st-century American lawyers
21st-century American judges
Judges of the United States District Court for the Eastern District of Oklahoma
Judges of the United States District Court for the Northern District of Oklahoma
Judges of the United States District Court for the Western District of Oklahoma
Lawyers from Tulsa, Oklahoma
Oklahoma lawyers
Oklahoma State University alumni
People from Lima, Ohio
United States district court judges appointed by Donald Trump
University of Tulsa College of Law alumni